Olimpia Elbląg is a Polish professional football team based in Elbląg, Poland, competing in II liga. It was founded in 1945.

Facilities

Olimpia Stadium 

Olimpia has played near Agrykola 8 Street since 1945. There are projects for a new stadium for the team, but there is no decision when the investment will take place.

Training Camp Skrzydlata 
Since the 1980s Olimpia have had the current training camp which consists of a small number of football pitches (one with an organic lawn). The club is constantly being modernized, which includes the 2010 renovation.

Club history

Historical Names 
Syrena (1945), Stocznia (1946), Olympia (1946), KS Tabory (1946), Ogniwo (1949), Stal (1949), Budowlani (1951), Kolejarz (1951), Spójnia (1954), Turbina (1955), Olimpia (1955), Sparta (1955), TKS Polonia (1956)
Olimpia Elbląg (1960–1992)
KS Polonia Elbląg (1992–2002)
KS Polonia Olimpia Elbląg (2002–2004)
Piłkarski KS Olimpia Elbląg (since October 15, 2004)

Club crest 
The club crest has been changed many times throughout the club's history. Mostly the club uses the current team motif.

Changes of Olimpia Elbląg crest 1946–2010

Achievements 
 8 seasons in the Polish First League
Highest position: 8th
 1/8 final Polish Cup – season 1976/77
 Runners up in the Polish Youth Championships – 1989 (final against Górnik Zabrze)

Current squad

Youth teams 

Some of the most famous players whose careers started in the Olimpia youth teams are: Adam Fedoruk (former Poland International, UEFA Champions League participant with Legia Warsaw), Bartosz Białkowski (Southampton F.C. goalkeeper) and Maciej Bykowski (former Panathinaikos Athens player).

Coaches & Managers 
Coaches & Managers since 1960, when Olimpia was created from Elbląg's other football clubs

Fans 
The team supporters live mostly in Elbląg. The largest attendance at the Olimpia's stadium were recorded during the Polish Second League games in the 1970s and 1980s: 10,000 attendants during the 1/16 final of the Polish Cup in autumn 1976 or circa 12,000 when Olimpia was playing in Second League in the mid-1970s.

Fans from Elbląg have their own association called 776 p.n.e. (the date symbolising the first Ancient Olympic Games) and an ultras group called SMG'06.

In 2004, the Olimpia fans have created their own team ZKS Olimpia Elbląg (historical club name). They have protested against club policy. After two seasons, the team reached the 5th level in the Polish football, but after several years, the two sides came to an agreement and merged the two clubs.

Elbląg has another football team called Concordia, but only Olimpia has an organised fanbase. The Olimpia fans have friendly relationships with supporters of Legia Warsaw and Zagłębie Sosnowiec.

Their main rivals are local clubs Stomil Olsztyn, Jeziorak Iława and to a lesser extent Arka Gdynia.

References

External links 
 Official website of the club
 Olimpia's fans site

 
Association football clubs established in 1945
1945 establishments in Poland
Sport in Elbląg
Football clubs in Warmian-Masurian Voivodeship